The Russ Abbot Show is a British television sketch comedy series which stars Russ Abbot and ran for 16 years on television before moving over to Radio 2 for a further five years.

History 
The series originated as The Freddie Starr Variety Madhouse; with Russ Abbot, Mike Newman, Toni Palmer, Norman Collier and Bella Emberg. After one series in 1979, Freddie Starr left and the show was repackaged as  "Russ Abbot's Madhouse" premiering on 12 April 1980, with Liz Smith, Dustin Gee, Nicky Croydon and Billy Hartman joining the cast. 

From the 1981 series there was a major cast upheaval, with many of the cast being replaced, with the new lineup being Dustin Gee, Bella Emberg, Susie Blake, Sherrie Hewson, Jeffrey Holland, Patti Gold, and Michael Barrymore. Les Dennis joined in Series 3 and Michael Barrymore left in Series 4. 

In 1986 the series was transferred over to the BBC, where it was renamed The Russ Abbot Show, and featured Dennis, Emberg, Hewson, Holland, Suzi Aitchison, Tom Bright, Maggie Moone, Paul Shearer, and Lisa Maxwell.  In 1991 allegedly the BBC was heard to announce at the Montreux Television Festival that Abbot no longer represented what the audience wanted to see on their screens and the series transferred to ITV.

After the final television series in 1996, the series moved to BBC Radio 2 for 50 episodes from November 1997 to February 2002.

Format 
The series showcased Abbot's talents as an all round entertainer and included characters such as Basildon Bond, a James Bond parody; 'Cooperman', a cross between Tommy Cooper and Superman; and C.U. Jimmy, a virtually unintelligible, red-headed, kilt-wearing Scotsman. The programme attracted millions of viewers weekly. The show was popular amongst younger viewers, prompting two annuals to be published in 1982 and 1983. The annuals featured comic strips based on popular characters Abbot had created in the various series of the show. It was also notable for its "Tears of laughter" theme song, which played at the start and end of the show. The stop-motion animated titles were produced by 3 Peach Animation.

Russ Abbot's Madhouse 
 Series 1: 12 April – 31 May 1980. 7 Episodes
 Series 2: 13 June – 1 August 1981. 8 Episodes
 Series 3: 17 July – 21 August 1982. 6 Episodes
 Series 4: 23 April – 28 May 1983. 6 Episodes
 Series 5: 22 October – 26 November 1983.  6 Episodes
 Series 6: 30 June – 4 August 1984. 6 Episodes
 Series 7: 31 August – 5 October 1985. 6 Episodes

Specials 
 1. Russ Abbot and a Show of his Very Own:  2 Jan 81
 2. Russ Abbot's Christmas Madhouse: 26 Dec 1981
 3. Russ Abbot's Madhouse Annual: 7 Nov 1982
 4. Russ Abbot's Hogmanay Lighthouse: 31 Dec 1982
 5. Russ Abbot's Christmas Madhouse: 22 Dec 1984
 6. Russ Abbot's Summer Madhouse: 29 June 1985

The Russ Abbot Show 
Eight series were made of The Russ Abbot Show, between 1986 and 1996.

BBC Series 
 Spring special: 26 May 1986
 Series 1: 13 September – 25 October 1986:  8 Episodes
 Christmas special: 25 December 1986
 Series 2: 12 September – 31 October 1987:  8 Episodes
 Christmas special: 25 December 1987
 Series 3: 3 September – 28 October 1988:  8 Episodes
 Christmas special: 25 December 1988
 Series 4: 2 September – 18 November 1989:  12 Episodes
 Christmas special: 25 December 1989
 Series 5: 1 September – 17 November 1990:  12 Episodes
 Christmas special: 26 December 1990
 Series 6: 6 September – 29 November 1991: 12 Episodes

ITV Series 
 Series 7: 5 September – 17 October 1994:  7 Episodes
 Series 8: 10 July – 21 August 1995:  7 Episodes
 Christmas Special – 26 December 1996

References

External links 

1980 British television series debuts
1996 British television series endings
1980s British television sketch shows
1990s British television sketch shows
BBC Radio comedy programmes
BBC television sketch shows
English-language television shows
ITV sketch shows
Television shows produced by Granada Television
Television series by ITV Studios